Magda Isanos (17 April 1916 – 17 November 1944) was a Romanian poet.

Biography
Born in Iași, her parents were Mihail Isanos and his wife Elisabeta (née Bălan), doctors at the Costiugeni psychiatric hospital near Chișinău. Elisabeta was the sister of Elena Alistar. After graduating from the Diocesan High School in Chișinău, Magda entered the law faculty of Iași University in 1934. While there, she was affiliated with left-wing student societies. After graduating, Isanos briefly worked as a lawyer in Iași. She was married to the writer Eusebiu Camilar.

Isanos made her published debut in 1932, in Licurici magazine. Her work appeared in Însemnări ieșene, Iașul, Jurnalul literar, Viața Basarabiei, Pagini basarabene, Vremea, Cuget moldovenesc, Revista Fundațiilor Regale and Viața Românească. She died in Bucharest at age 28 after a long illness and period of awaiting the end. Obsessively returning to the theme of death, her grave, musical verses (Poezii, 1943) hover between despair and euphoria. Her lyric verses were collected into posthumous anthologies: Țara luminii (1946), Poezii (1947), Versuri (1955), Versuri (1964), Poezii (1974). She was awarded the debut prize of Editura Fundației Regale pentru Literatură și Artă for her four-act drama Focurile. Written in collaboration with her husband, the play was published posthumously in 1945.

References

1916 births
1944 deaths
Writers from Iași
Alexandru Ioan Cuza University alumni
20th-century Romanian lawyers
20th-century Romanian poets
Romanian women poets
20th-century Romanian dramatists and playwrights
Burials at Bellu Cemetery
Romanian women lawyers